The 1922 LFF Lyga was the 1st season of the LFF Lyga football competition in Lithuania.  It was contested by 6 teams, and LFLS Kaunas I won the championship.

League standings

References
RSSSF

LFF Lyga seasons
Lith
Lith
1922 in Lithuanian football